WVLC (99.9 FM) is a country music-formatted radio station licensed to Mannsville, Kentucky, United States.  The station is owned by Shoreline Communications, Inc.

References

External links

VLC